Vibes is the eighth studio album by Heavy D. It is a reggae album, and does not contain any rapping.

Track listing 
"Long Distance Girlfriend" -	Dofat, Longe, Myers	4:18
"No Matter What"	  - Brown, Myers, Winans	4:12
"Queen Majesty"	- Mayfield, Myers	3:51
"Love Me Like This" (ft. Barrington Levy)	- Myers	3:43
"My Love Is All I Have"	- Myers	3:44
"Hugs and Kisses"	- Flowers	3:33
"Private Dancer" (ft. Sizzla)	- Myers	3:32
"Delilah"	- Campbell, Myers	3:33
"Chasing Windmills" -	Dofat, Myers, Omley, Smith, Smith	3:27
"Sincere"	- Bereal, Bereal, Brown, Myers	4:23

Album chart positions

References

Heavy D albums
Albums produced by Warryn Campbell
2008 albums
Albums produced by Mars (record producer)